T-cell growth factors acronym: TCGF(s) are signaling molecules collectively called growth factors which stimulate the production and development of T-cells.  A number of them have been discovered, among them many members of the interleukin family.  The thymus is one organ which releases TCGFs.  TCGFs have been able to induce T-cell production outside the body for injection.

List of TCGFs
 IL-2
 IL-7
 IL-9
 IL-15

References

Immunology
Growth factors